Koshcheyevo is a rural locality (a village) in Nikolotorzhskoye Rural Settlement, Kirillovsky District, Vologda Oblast, Russia. The population was 25 as of 2002.

Geography 
Koshcheyevo is located 39 km east of Kirillov (the district's administrative centre) by road. Rukino is the nearest rural locality.

References 

Rural localities in Kirillovsky District